The Port au Port Peninsula is a peninsula in the Canadian province of Newfoundland and Labrador.  Roughly triangular in shape, it is located on the west coast of the island of Newfoundland.

Geography

The peninsula extends into the Gulf of St. Lawrence and is joined to Newfoundland by a narrow isthmus connecting at the town of Port au Port. It is bounded on the south by Bay St. George, the western side by the Gulf of St. Lawrence, and on the northwestern side by Port au Port Bay.

With a rocky shoreline measuring approximately 130 km in length, the peninsula extends approximately 40 km west from its isthmus to Cape St. George and northwest 50 km to the fingerlike Long Point which by itself is approximately 25 km in length.  The eastern shore of the peninsula is irregular, jutting into Port au Port Bay.

The Port au Port Peninsula is located on the western edge of the heavily eroded Appalachian Mountain chain which runs along Newfoundland's west coast. There are no natural harbours along the peninsula's rocky coastline. The peninsula was once heavily forested but many areas along its shores have been cleared for subsistence farming.

The southern shore is hilly with the northern shore having a sloping lowland extending to a low rise along the centre of the eastern part of the peninsula. The geological structure is complex with the peninsula's sedimentary strata dating to the middle Cambrian to early Ordovician continental margin, creating a carbonate platform of limestone, shale, and sandstone. The heavily folded geological structure in the area has been identified as having an unknown amount of petroleum reserves.

History
The area was named "Ophor portu" (port of rest) by Basque fishermen during the 16th-17th centuries.  French and Basque fishermen used the west coast of Newfoundland, including the Port au Port Peninsula, for seasonal fishing settlements, however some began permanently inhabiting the area. Mi'kmaq families, who came from Nova Scotia with the French to fight the British in the 30 years war, were also present in the area.

During and after the Treaty of Utrecht in 1713 and Treaty of Paris in 1763, France retained the right to use the west coast of the island.  This area came to be known as the "French Shore" and the Port au Port Peninsula was at its centre.

Scattered settlement continued in the area until 1904 when France relinquished its right of use to the "French Shore".  The Port au Port Peninsula represents the most varied ethnic and linguistic mix in the entire island of Newfoundland, including Mi'kmaq families with the highest proportion of French-speaking settlement on the island (15%).

The French minority, a mix of Mi'kmaq, Acadian, French and Basque, has had an important influence on the area's culture.  Newfoundland's unique folk music has been somewhat influenced by musicians from the Port au Port Peninsula, notably Émile Benoît. Additionally, the area's strong Roman Catholic tradition is reflected in the high visibility accorded to churches throughout the peninsula's communities.

As the centre of the province's Franco-Newfoundlander community, the peninsula has been designated the only bilingual district on the island of Newfoundland since 1971.

Economy
The Port au Port Peninsula's economy is based on natural resources, namely fishing. Limited forestry takes place in the unsettled areas of the interior and a small amount of subsistence farming takes place along coastal areas. Many residents of the peninsula, particularly the communities at the eastern end near the isthmus, work in nearby Kippens and Stephenville.

Beginning in 1900 a limestone quarrying operation was established at Aguathuna, near the peninsula's isthmus where the Table Head mountain ridge extends from the Lewis Hills. The limestone was used by Dominion Steel and Coal Corporation at a steel mill in Sydney, Nova Scotia. The quarry was closed in 1966 following DOSCO's financial difficulties.

From 1941–1966, many people in the eastern end of the peninsula were employed at Ernest Harmon AFB in nearby Stephenville.

From the 1970s to present a major limestone quarry began operating at Lower Cove employing 30-40 people.

In the 1980s-1990s, petroleum companies began exploring the peninsula for oil. Some deposits were discovered in recoverable quantities and limited production wells are in place at some locations. Geologists have estimated that a much larger deposit exists deeper and possibly off shore from the peninsula in the 400-500 billion barrel range, however exploration drilling has not yet confirmed this theory.

The primary employer in Stephenville was a paper mill, which closed in 2005.

A Canadian energy company may soon get the green light to begin drilling for oil off Newfoundland's southwest coast.
The Canadian Imperial Venture Corporation (CIVC) is waiting for approval from the federal-provincial oil regulator – the Canada Newfoundland and Labrador Offshore Petroleum Board – to drill a test well on Shoal Point, near the Port Au Port Peninsula.
The company has been exploring in the area over the last few years. It discovered some oil there in 2008.
"At the turn of the century there were several wells on the Port Au Port Peninsula, and Shoal Point, that produced somewhere between 20 to 25 barrels a day," said Kirby Mercer, CIVC's vice-president.
"Now, we're going in with modern technology, modern tools. So we hope to extract the black gold using modern technology."
Mercer said if the company receives approval for a test well and drilling is successful, CIVC hopes the Offshore Petroleum Board will then approve a significant discovery licence. That would bring the company one step closer to establishing an oil-producing well in western Newfoundland. 
Port au Port peninsula once was vast number of caribou here was introduce in the early 60’s about 14 in the late 70’s herds were doing good in the hundreds until the snowmobile became popular after the 80’s herd plenish until extinction because of poaching. 15 years the last 2 caribou was poached. Our muskrat was once was seen its faith to no more. Many times, beaver was introduced and seemed to disappear because of poaching, The white moose was supposing sacred to the people but still seem to be hunted or poached. Mat the moose was one he to see his faith as stories were told through the communities. Many animals have been over hunted or poached from wild animals Eagles and protected water foul. Our local fishermen destroyed the lump fish because of caviar the Lump Roe which seen the extinction of lump fish around the Port au Port peninsula.

In 2022, a "hydrogen aliance" was forged between Canada and Germany.  As part of this project, a network of 164 wind turbines was announced, taking advantage of the favorable wind conditions in Port au Port.  However, the project has yet to undergo full environmental review. 

Today travellers access the area using the Marine Atlantic ferry service to Channel-Port aux Basques or with the Stephenville International Airport.

Communities
The Port au Port Peninsula is a relatively insular region and contains a collection of approximately 20 communities:

Southern Shore
Following Route 460:
 Port au Port
 Bellmans Cove
 Felix Cove
 Man of War Cove
 Campbells Cove
 Campbells Creek
 Abraham's Cove
 Jerry's Nose
 Ship Cove
 Lower Cove
 Sheaves Cove
 Marches Point
 De Grau
 Red Brook
 Grand Jardin
 Petit Jardin
 Cape St. George

Northern Shore
Following Route 463:
 Cape St. George
 Mainland
 Three Rock Cove
 Salmon Cove
 Lourdes
 Winterhouse
 Black Duck Brook
 Blue Beach
 Long Point

Eastern Shore
Following Route 463 and local roads:
 Lourdes
 Tea Cove
 West Bay Centre
 Piccadilly
 Boswarlos
 Aguathuna

See also
Le Gaboteur
List of communities in Newfoundland and Labrador

References

Peninsulas of Newfoundland and Labrador
French Canada